Ocoliș is a commune located in Alba County, Transylvania, Romania. It is composed of four villages: Lunca Largă (Lunkalárga), Ocoliș, Runc (Aronyosronk) and Vidolm (Vidaly).

The river Ocoliș is a left tributary of the Arieș; it flows through the commune, and joins the Arieș in Ocoliș village. 

In July 2021, rains and storms destroyed three houses and severely damaged another 20 in Ocoliș. More than 220 liters of precipitation per square meter fell in the area in five hours. Dozens of people had to be evacuated because of the resulting floods.

References

Communes in Alba County
Localities in Transylvania